Lycium chinense is one of two species of boxthorn shrub in the family Solanaceae. Along with Lycium barbarum, it produces the goji berry ("wolfberry"). Two varieties are recognized, L. chinense var. chinense and  L. chinense var. potaninii. It is also known as Chinese boxthorn, Chinese matrimony-vine, Chinese teaplant, Chinese wolfberry, wolfberry, and Chinese desert-thorn.

Description 
The stems are highly branched.

Leaves 
Lycium chinense leaves form on the shoot either solitary in an alternating arrangement or in bundles of 2 to 4.

Flowers
The bell-shaped or tubular calyx (eventually ruptured by the growing berry) splits halfway into short, triangular, densely ciliate lobes. The stamens are structured with filaments longer than the anthers, slightly shorter or longer than the corolla, with a villous ring slightly above the base and the adjacent corolla tube. The anthers are longitudinally dehiscent.

Fruit and seeds 
It contains compressed yellow seeds, from 2.5 to 3 mm wide, with a curved embryo; their number varies widely based on cultivar and fruit size, from 10 to 60. The berries ripen from July to October in the Northern Hemisphere.

Disease
It can be parasitized by the oomycete species Peronospora lycii.

Use 
The fruits may be infused with hot water to make goji tea. The plant has been used for centuries in traditional Chinese medicine for treating various disorders, although there is no high-quality clinical evidence that consuming it has any effect on health or disease.

Chemistry

The fruit composition is similar to that of L. barbarum, with  polysaccharides, carotenoids and flavonoids as main constituents. Rutin is a prominent flavonoid, while the main carotenoid is zeaxanthin dipalmitate (49% of the carotenoid fraction), with β-carotene, two cerebrosides, and three pyrrole derivatives as other constituents.

Dozens of secondary metabolites have been isolated and identified from the roots, root bark, and leaves, including cyclic peptides, alkaloids, and flavonoids. Citric acid is the major nonvolatile organic acid in the leaves followed by oxalic acid.

Gallery

See also
 List of culinary fruits
 List of dried foods

References

External links

 United States Department of Agriculture
 

chinense
Edible Solanaceae
Medicinal plants
Dried fruit
Herbs
Leaf vegetables
Plants used in traditional Chinese medicine
Geography of Ningxia
Taxa named by Philip Miller